Idea lynceus, the tree-nymph (Malaysian giant tree-nymph), is a species of nymphalid butterfly in the Danainae subfamily. It is found in South East Asia.

The wingspan is about 135–165 mm.

The larvae feed on Aganosma corymbosa.

Subspecies
Listed alphabetically:
 I. l. favorinus Fruhstorfer, 1910
 I. l. fumata Fruhstorfer, 1897 (southern Borneo)
 I. l. lynceus (Malaysian giant tree-nymph)(Burma, Thailand, Peninsular Malaya, Langkawi, Sumatra)
 I. l. niasica Fruhstorfer, 1903 (Nias)
 I. l. reinwardti Moore, 1883
 I. l. thalassica Fruhstorfer, 1910

References

Idea (butterfly)
Butterflies of Borneo
Butterflies of Indochina
Butterflies described in 1773
Taxa named by Dru Drury